The Lubbock Gunslingers were a professional indoor football team.  They played their home games in Lubbock, Texas, at Lubbock Municipal Coliseum.

The Gunslingers played in 2004 as a charter member of the Intense Football League when they were known as the Lubbock Lone Stars, receiving some criticism locally as it was felt that the phrase Lone Star should not be pluralized.  Besides that, they ended their inaugural year at 9-7 and won over the Odessa Roughnecks in the Semifinals, yet lost to the Amarillo Dusters in Intense Bowl I.

Following their sole year in the IFL, the team joined the NIFL for the 2005 season, where they finished with a lackluster 4-10 record, but still finished second in the Pacific North Division. 

New ownership was unable to begin play in 2006.  Most of the team's regional travel partners bolted for the reorganized Intense Football League, while the Gunslingers had chosen to remain in the NIFL and wait another season to restart the team.

af2 

Later in 2006, in a move that essentially spelled the end for the Gunslingers, the rights to play indoor football in the Coliseum were sold to Texas af2 Holdings, LLC, who also manages the Laredo Lobos, Texas Copperheads, and the Corpus Christi Sharks. An af2 expansion team, the Lubbock Renegades, began play in 2007.

Season-By-Season 

|-
| colspan="6" align="center" | Lubbock Lone Stars (IFL)
|-
|2004 || 9 || 7 || 0 || 2nd League || Won Semifinal (Odessa)Lost Intense Bowl I (Amarillo)
|-
| colspan="6" align="center" | Lubbock Gunslingers (NIFL)
|-
|2005 || 4 || 10 || 0 || 2nd Pacific North || --
|-
|2006 || colspan="6" align="center" | Did Not Play
|-
!Totals || 14 || 18 || 0
|colspan="2"| (including playoffs)

External links 
 Official Site

Gunslingers
Intense Football League teams
Defunct American football teams in Texas
2004 establishments in Texas
2006 disestablishments in Texas
American football teams established in 2004
American football teams disestablished in 2006